Guañacagua (hispanicized spelling of Aymara Waña Q'awa, waña dry, q'awa little river, ditch, crevice, fissure, gap in the earth, "dry brook" or "dry ravine") is a village in the Arica and Parinacota Region, Chile.

References

Populated places in Arica Province